Lander Crossing (also, Lander) is an unincorporated community in Placer County, California. It lies at an elevation of 2300 feet (701 m).

The name honors Frederick West Lander, superintendent for the wagon road in 1858.

References

Unincorporated communities in Placer County, California
Colfax, California
Unincorporated communities in California